Brian Michael Iloski (born September 4, 1995) is an American professional soccer player who currently plays as a midfielder for Orange County in the USL Championship.

Club career

Legia Warsaw
Iloski originally was drafted by the Colorado Rapids, but soon after joined Legia Warsaw in a winter training camp in Spain and Florida before signing with the Polish club on a 2-year contract with the option for a third year. Brian is also the first American to play for Legia Warsaw. Iloski debuted for Legia on March 11, 2018 being subbed in the second half stoppage time in a 3-1 win against Lechia Gdańsk.

LA Galaxy II
After parting ways with Legia Warsaw, Iloski went back to California and signed on with the LA Galaxy reserve team on April 4, 2019.

Orange County SC
On February 21, 2020, Iloski joined USL Championship side Orange County SC.

Career Statistics

Club

Personal
Brian has two younger brothers, Milan and Eric, who are also professional soccer players.

References

External links
 Profile at Soccerway
 Profile at 90minut.pl (in Polish)

1995 births
Living people
American soccer players
UCLA Bruins men's soccer players
San Diego Zest players
Legia Warsaw players
MFK Zemplín Michalovce players
Slovak Super Liga players
USL League Two players
Colorado Rapids draft picks
Soccer players from California
Sportspeople from Escondido, California
American expatriate sportspeople in Poland
American expatriate sportspeople in Slovakia
Expatriate footballers in Poland
Expatriate footballers in Slovakia
American people of Macedonian descent
Association football midfielders
LA Galaxy II players
USL Championship players
Orange County SC players